The 12177 / 12178 Howrah–Mathura Chambal Express is a Express train of the Indian Railways connecting  in West Bengal and  of Uttar Pradesh. It is currently being operated with 12175/12176 train numbers on a weekly basis.

Service
The 12177/Howrah–Mathura Chambal Express has an average speed of 55 km/hr and covers 1460 km in 26 hrs 55 mins. 12178/Mathura–Howrah Chambal Express has an average speed of 55 km/hr and covers 1294 km in 26 hrs 20 mins.

Route & halts

The important halts of the train are:
 
 
 
 
 
 
 
 
 
 
 
 
 
 
 
 
 
 
 
 
 Kulpahar

Coach composition

The train has standard ICF rakes with max speed of 110 kmph. The train consists of 20 coaches:

 1 AC II Tier
 2 AC III Tier
 10 sleeper coaches
 5 general
 2 second-class luggage/parcel vans

Traction

Now the route is fully electrified, it is hauled by Howrah-based WAP-7 (HOG)-equipped locomotive on its entire journey.

Rake sharing

The train shares its rake with 12175/12176 Chambal Express.

See also 
 Howrah railway station
 Mathura Junction railway station
 Chambal Express

Notes

External links 
 12177/Howrah - Mathura Chambal Express India Rail Info
 12178/Mathura - Howrah Chambal Express India Rail Info

References 

Rail transport in Howrah
Transport in Mathura
Rail transport in West Bengal
Rail transport in Madhya Pradesh
Rail transport in Jharkhand
Rail transport in Bihar
Rail transport in Uttar Pradesh
Express trains in India
Named passenger trains of India